Syzygium eucalyptoides is a tree of the family Myrtaceae native to Western Australia and the Northern Territory.

References

Myrtales of Australia
Trees of Australia
Flora of Western Australia
eucalyptoides
Taxa named by Ferdinand von Mueller